The term market sector is used in economics and finance to describe a part of the economy. It is usually a broader term than industry, which is a set of businesses that are buying and selling such similar goods and services that they are in direct competition with each other.

See also
 Economic sector
 Global Industry Classification Standard (GICS)
 Industry Classification Benchmark (ICB)
 Market segmentation
 Thomson Reuters Business Classification (TRBC)

References

Financial markets
Market segmentation